Kwaggafontein is a town along the Moloto Road (R573) under Thembisile Hani Local Municipality Jurisdiction in the Nkangala District Municipality, which is located in the Mpumalanga province of South Africa. It was established in the late 1940s by the Amandebele tribe. The Ndebele people came from farms that today are in the Mpumalanga and Gauteng provinces. Many around current day Bronkhorstspruit, Delmas and Balmoral.

It is a modern, civilised area consisting of schools, Kwagga Mall (formerly Kwagga Plaza), and a market.

Nomenclature 
The place gets its name from the extinct quagga animal. The area was once a farm for quaggas (zebra and donkey breeds). It is also called Mkobola by the locals.

References

Populated places in the Thembisile Hani Local Municipality